Samantha Greenberg is the founder, managing partner and chief investment officer (CIO) of Margate Capital Management. Her specialist areas are Technology, Media & Telecommunications (TMT) and Consumer industries.

Employment history
Before establishing Margate Capital Management, Greenberg was an investment banking analyst at the mergers and acquisitions department at Goldman Sachs Group (1998), an associate at Francisco Partners (1999), and a vice-president in the investment analysis division at Chilton Investment Co. (2003). She then went back to Goldman as a vice-president in the firm's Special Situations Group.

In 2009 Greenberg took up a position at Paulson & Co. as head of the media, cable, satellite and consumer sectors. Two years later she was promoted to partner. During her time at Paulson, she trained and managed junior analysts and worked on the team that guided successful investments in firms including Cablevision, Comcast, Family Dollar and Time Warner Cable. Her last day at Paulson was January 29, 2016.

In 2019, it was reported that Greenberg would be closing her hedge fund to take a position at Citadel LLC.

Margate Capital Management
Greenberg launched the Margate Capital Management hedge fund at the end of January 2016. The firm operates a long/short equity fund with a focus on the media and consumer sectors, implementing a rules-based risk approach to protect capital and reduce volatility. On April 12, 2016, she received a seed money commitment of $130 million from Ramius LLC (the international investment management firm of Cowen Group Inc.) Ramius is the firm's first investor, making a three-year commitment.

Education
Greenberg graduated summa cum laude from the Wharton School of the University of Pennsylvania with a BS in economics and finance (featuring a dual concentration in finance and strategic management) and an MBA at Stanford University.

Philanthropy
Greenberg is co-vice chair of the investment management division of the UJA-Federation of New York. She sits on the board of directors of the 14th Street Y, and volunteers at the Young Women's Leadership Network.

Honors and recognition
Business Insider reporters referred to Greenberg as “one of the industry’s rare female hedge fund managers.” Prior to the establishment of her own hedge fund, she was named one of the 50 Leading Women in Hedge Funds in 2013 by the Hedge Fund Journal in association with Ernst & Young. In 2016 she was named the Hedge Fund Rising Star by Institutional Investor.

References

Living people
American hedge fund managers
American investors
American financial businesspeople
American financial company founders
Goldman Sachs people
Wharton School of the University of Pennsylvania alumni
Private equity and venture capital investors
Jewish American philanthropists
Year of birth missing (living people)
Chief investment officers
21st-century American Jews